Monaro Shire was a local government area in the Monaro region of New South Wales, Australia. Monaro Shire was proclaimed on 7 March 1906. 

The Shire contained the villages of Bredbo and Nimmitabel. 

The Local Government Areas Amalgamation Act 1980 saw the amalgamation of Monaro Shire with the Municipality of Cooma to form Cooma-Monaro Shire on 1 January 1981.

References

Former local government areas of New South Wales
1906 establishments in Australia
1981 disestablishments in Australia